Acrocordia gemmata is a species of lichen belonging to the family Monoblastiaceae.

Synonym:
 Arthopyrenia gemmata (Ach.) A.Massal., 1852

References

Dothideomycetes